Chandresh Patel Kordia  (born 1952) is an Indian politician who is a leader of the Bharatiya Janata Party and a former member of Lok Sabha. He was elected to Lok Sabha five times from Jamnagar.

References

1952 births
Lok Sabha members from Gujarat
People from Jamnagar
India MPs 1989–1991
India MPs 1991–1996
India MPs 1996–1997
India MPs 1998–1999
India MPs 1999–2004
Living people
Bharatiya Janata Party politicians from Gujarat